Bridget Brind  is a British civil servant and diplomat, currently serving as Ambassador of the United Kingdom to Jordan.

Early life

Career 
Brind joined the Foreign and Commonwealth Office (FCO) in 1995.

Brind worked in the Department for Exiting the European Union.

Brind became the first female UK ambassador to Jordan in 2020.

Personal life 
Brind is married. She has one child, a daughter.

References

External links 
 Biography on GOV.UK

Living people
Officers of the Order of the British Empire
21st-century British diplomats
British women ambassadors
Ambassadors of the United Kingdom to Jordan
Year of birth missing (living people)